Kampong Sungai Belukut is a village in Brunei-Muara District, Brunei. The population was 612 in 2016. It is one of the villages within Mukim Kota Batu. The postcode is BD2217.

References 

Sungai Belukut